The Battle of Djebok was a battle that took place in March 2013 in the area of Djebok, during the Mali war.

The fight
The French and Malian troops left Gao on 12 March heading to In Zekouan, arriving there by the evening, and beginning search operations. They found nothing, but when the night came, two pickup trucks came up with several Islamist fighters and attacked the French and Malians. After the two pickups were destroyed, the terrorists abandoned their attack and managed to retreat. After this clash, two other pickup trucks were spotted two kilometers away. The French and Malians attacked them, destroying one, but failed to destroy the other. The next day, the French began to search In Zekouan and discovered an improvised explosive device manufactured with a bomb plane. Shortly afterward, the Jihadists ambushed a group of soldiers. The soldiers manage to push back the Islamists, entering the woods. Then another group of soldiers was attacked. The French and Malian soldiers begun to retreat, but then bombarded the Jihadist's positions in the forest. In the night the fighting stopped and the French and Malians captured the area, but they found no bodies or traces of the Islamists.

On 14 March, north of Imenas, an aircraft located a pickup truck whose passengers were placing an improvised explosive device on the road ahead of the French and Malian column. Fighter planes and three helicopters were sent to the scene. They ambushed six pickup trucks in Torteuli, some filled with explosives. The helicopters opened fire, destroying all of the vehicles. The next day, the soldiers entered Torteuli but were attacked by fighters. After a brief exchange of fire, the Islamists fled into the woods.

The next day, French forces searched the in Zekouan again, but did not find anything suspicious. None was killed in the side of the French and Malians during the fighting, but the French estimated that about 15 to 40 Islamists were killed during the battle.

References

2013 in Mali
Conflicts in 2013
Battles involving France
Gao Region
Mali War
March 2013 events in Africa

Battles in 2013